Jasper Goes Hunting is an animated short film in the Puppetoons series, directed by George Pal and first released on July 29, 1944. The short was distributed by Paramount Pictures.

The short includes a scene with Bugs Bunny as a cameo voiced by Mel Blanc, which was animated by Warner Bros. animator Robert McKimson. It marks the first time a Looney Tunes character was officially used outside of a Warner Bros. related production.

Plot 
The short features Jasper, his friend/nemesis Professor Scarecrow, and Blackbird. The short opens with a brief view of the hovel where Jasper lives with his mother, then the camera moves to the chicken coop. Jasper's mother counts her chickens and realizes there is another one missing. She has realized that she is facing a chicken thief. Nearby, said thief, the Scarecrow, is seen finishing his meal.

Next Jasper's mother prepares to leave her residence. She first arms Jasper and tasks him with guarding the chickens. Jasper fancies himself a soldier, and starts marching within his residence. When the Scarecrow appears at his window, Jasper immediately points the weapon at him. The Scarecrow is at first terrified. Then explains to Jasper that he should not be pointing the weapon at live targets, since it is likely to go off. Convincing the boy to hand him the gun, the Scarecrow claims that the "mean-looking" weapon reminds him of his past as a big game hunter.

As the Scarecrow begins narrating his supposed past at the Belgian Congo, the scenery changes around the characters. The interior of the hovel is replaced by a jungle environment. The trio are off to a hunting expedition. As the Scarecrow explains that they ate after big game, he fails to notice an African elephant standing behind him. When he does notice, the "brave" hunter flees in terror. In a 23-second scene, the Scarecrow points his gun at a rabbit hole and orders its resident to come out. Bugs Bunny emerges, notices his surrounding and realizes that he is in "the wrong picture", and returns to his hole.

A confrontation with an enraged elephant sends the trio flying back towards the hovel. The Scarecrow lands in the chicken coop and is soon confronted by Jasper's mother, who is also armed and figures that this guy is the chicken thief. The final scenes has the Scarecrow and Blackbird in prison.

Background 
The Jasper series of shorts relied on a small, consistent cast. The titular character was a playful pickaninny, his mother a protective mammy, Professor Scarecrow being a black scam artist, and the Blackbird serving as his fast-talking partner-in-crime. Pal described his protagonist as a Huckleberry Finn influenced by African-American folktales. Considering that the righteous boy consistently managed to outwit his plotting enemies, one can see some resemblance to Br'er Rabbit.

The series' use of stereotypes did not seem to attract much criticism at first, but in 1946, Ebony reported "Negro" groups protesting their depiction by Pal. In an apparent response to the criticism, Pal released John Henry and the Inky-Poo (1946), a short based on the folk hero John Henry. Ebony responded favorably at this more serious depiction of a "Negro" protagonist.

Sources

References

1944 films
1944 animated films
1944 short films
1940s American animated films
1940s animated short films
Films directed by George Pal
Films about hunters
Films set in Belgian Congo
Animated crossover films
American animated short films
Paramount Pictures short films
Puppetoons
Bugs Bunny films